Truth Is may refer to:

 "Truth Is" (Fantasia song)
 "Truth Is" (Brother Ali song)
 Truth Is (album), a 2019 album by Sabrina Claudio, or the title track

See also
 The Truth Is... (disambiguation)